Tits & Clits Comix is an all-female underground comics anthology put together by Joyce Farmer and Lyn Chevli, published from 1972 to 1987. In addition to Farmer and Chevli, contributors to Tits & Clits included Roberta Gregory, Lee Marrs, and Trina Robbins.

Along with such titles as It Aint Me, Babe and Wimmen's Comix, Tits & Clits was part of a movement by female cartoonists to counter the male-dominated, often blatantly misogynistic, works of the underground. With the conviction that sex was political, the series was created with the focus of sexuality from a female perspective.

Publication history 
Seeing what they perceived as the inherent sexism of the mostly male-underground comix scene, as well as the phoniness of mainstream pornographic magazines like Playboy and Penthouse, Farmer and Chevli published Tits & Clits (under the publisher name Nanny Goat Productions) as a sex-positive feminist comic. The first issue appeared in July 1972, preceding Wimmen's Comix by a few months. In addition to Tits & Clits, the duo also produced a one-shot comic about reproductive rights, Abortion Eve, in 1973.

The first issue of Tits & Clits sold out of its first printing of 20,000 copies by the next year. Because the series' title limited its exposure, the second issue appeared in 1973 under the title  Box Comix (sic - apostrophe omitted). Condemned by many feminists (even other cartoonists), as well as the expected antagonism from male underground cartoonists, Tits & Clits also suffered from a 1973 pornography investigation by the Orange County, California, district attorney's office.

The series returned to its original title in 1976, with a new issue . Farmer and Chevli published three issues of Tits & Clits on their own from 1972 to 1987 (often in print runs of 10,000–20,000). The title was opened up to other contributors starting with issue #3. Chevli stopped contributing after the third issue, but continued as co-editor through the sixth. 

San Francisco underground publisher Last Gasp picked the title up for its final four issues, which were published intermittently between 1977 and 1987. The final issue, #7, was published seven years after issue #6, and featured work by a number of younger cartoonists, part of a new generation of female alternative cartoonists. Mary Fleener acted as the co-editor along with Farmer. It also featured a story by Dennis Worden, the only male cartoonist to contribute to Tits & Clits.

Contributors 

 Joyce Farmer (as "Joyce Sutton") — founding contributor/editor
 Lyn Chevli (a.k.a. Lyn Chevely) (as "Chin Lyvely") — founding contributor/editor
 Carla Abbotts
 Joyce Brabner
 Dot Bucher
 Corrine Petteys (aka Comicazie)
 Tee Corinne (as "Cory")
 Joey Epstein
 Karen Feinberg
 Miriam Flambe
 Mary Fleener
 Melinda Gebbie
 Paula Gray
 Roberta Gregory
 Beverly Hilliard
 Julie Hollings (as "Jewelz")
 Michelle Jurris
 Krystine Kryttre
 Ruth Lynn
 Jennifer Malik
 Lee Marrs
 Carel Moiseiwitsch
 Chris Powers
 Terry Richards
 Trina Robbins
 Sharon Rudahl
 Shelby Sampson
 Dori Seda
 Leslie Sternbergh
 Luna Ticks
 Joanne Kunz (as "Rocky Trout")
 Dennis Worden

Notes

References

 Johnson, Kjerstin. "Adventures in Feministory: Women's Comics of the '70s and '80s", Bitch (Apr. 6, 2009).
 
 
 

Comics magazines published in the United States
1972 comics debuts
Comics about women
1987 comics endings
Erotic comics
Feminist comics
Underground comix